Skidmore, Owings & Merrill (SOM) is an American architectural, urban planning and engineering firm. It was founded in 1936 by Louis Skidmore and Nathaniel Owings in Chicago, Illinois. In 1939, they were joined by engineer John Merrill. The firm opened its second office, in New York City, in 1937 and has since expanded internationally, with offices in San Francisco, Los Angeles, Washington, D.C., London, Melbourne, Hong Kong, Shanghai, Seattle, and Dubai.

With a portfolio spanning thousands of projects across 50 countries, SOM is one of the most significant architectural firms in the world. The firm's notable current work includes the new headquarters for The Walt Disney Company, the global headquarters for Citigroup, Moynihan Train Hall and the expanded Penn Station complex, and the restoration and renovation of the Waldorf Astoria in New York City; airport projects at O’Hare International Airport, Kansas City International Airport, and Kempegowda International Airport; urban master plans for the Charenton-Bercy district in Paris, New Covent Garden in London, Treasure Island in San Francisco, the East Riverfront in Detroit; P.S. 62, the first net-zero-energy school in New York City; and the design of the Moon Village, a concept for the first permanent lunar settlement, developed with the European Space Agency and Massachusetts Institute of Technology.  Notable for its role as a pioneer of modernist architecture in America and for its groundbreaking work in skyscraper design and construction, SOM has designed some of the world's most significant architectural and urban projects including several of the tallest buildings in the world: John Hancock Center (1969, second tallest in the world when built), Willis Tower (1973, tallest in the world for over twenty years), One World Trade Center (2014, currently the seventh tallest in the world), and Burj Khalifa (2010, currently the world's tallest building).

SOM's multidisciplinary practice works across a range of scales and project types, providing services in architecture, building services/MEP engineering, digital design, graphics, interior design, structural engineering, civil engineering, sustainable design and urban design & planning.

History and influence

Early works 
The firm's first influential project was Lever House, completed in 1952 to become the first International Style office building in New York City. Constructed of glass and steel at a time when Park Avenue was lined with masonry buildings, Lever House introduced a modernist aesthetic that embodied the spirit of the times and influenced an entire generation of high-rise construction. As architectural historian Reyner Banham wrote in 1962, “It gave architectural expression to an age just as the age was being born ...  Lever House was an uncontrollable success, imitated and sometimes understood all over the Americanized world, and one of the sights of New York”. In 1982, the New York City Landmarks Preservation Commission designated Lever House an official landmark.

SOM's work in New York City included the Manufacturers Trust Company Building, completed in 1954 as the first International Style bank building in the United States, and the Pepsi-Cola World Headquarters, completed in 1960. Architectural historian Henry-Russell Hitchcock called the Pepsi building “the ultimate in refinement of proportion and elegance of materials,” while New York Times critic Ada Louise Huxtable placed it "at the top of the list, with Seagram and Lever House, of the city's few modern landmarks." The following year saw the completion of One Chase Manhattan Plaza (later 28 Liberty Street), the first International Style building to rise in New York City's Financial District. The project is noted for helping to turn the tide of a corporate exodus to Midtown Manhattan and the suburbs and reasserted Lower Manhattan as a viable business district after years of decline. SOM's design for 28 Liberty Street also transformed the crowded streetscape of the Financial District by creating a plaza surrounding the tower, a novel concept that would be adapted in many future projects.

Another example of SOM's modernist works is found in Colorado Springs, Colorado, where SOM planned a campus for the U.S. Air Force Academy. Built between 1958 and 1968, the campus broke from the traditions of West Point and Annapolis to become the first U.S. military academy designed in the modern style. The centerpiece of the campus is the Cadet Chapel, designed by architect Walter Netsch. The American Institute of Architects awarded the building with its prestigious Twenty-five Year Award, conferred onto "a building that has set a precedent for the last 25 to 35 years and continues to set standards of excellence for its architectural design and significance" .

Sustainable design 
SOM has a long history in sustainable architecture and design. In 1969, SOM founder Nathaniel Owings wrote, “Civilizations leave marks on the Earth by which they are known and judged. In large measure, the nature of their immortality is gauged by how well their builders made peace with the environment.” (source: Nathaniel Owings, “The American Aesthetic,” Harper & Row, 1969) This ethos has shaped the firm's journey into sustainable practices. An early example is a headquarters it designed for Weyerhaeuser Company, completed in 1971, which has been called the “original green building” not only for its integration into the surrounding landscape, but also for its use of efficient building systems. Another milestone in large-scale sustainable architecture was the completion of the U.S. Census Bureau Headquarters in 2007, the first federal office building to receive LEED certification. Like Weyerhaeuser, the design of the campus works in concert with its natural surroundings and incorporates a range of design strategies to reduce its environmental impact.

In 2015, SOM completed the first net-zero-energy school building in New York City and one of the first worldwide. The Kathleen Grimm School for Leadership and Sustainability at Sandy Ground, Staten Island, has been awarded for its sustainability performance by organizations including the American Institute of Architects, the Municipal Art Society, and Urban Land Institute. SOM has been recognized for its research and experimentation with new energy-saving and carbon-reducing technologies, such as a timber tower and a modified concrete slab design.

High-rise innovation 
In the 1970s, SOM pioneered a new era of skyscraper design with its work in Chicago, including the John Hancock Center (completed 1970) and Willis Tower (formerly Sears Tower), which became the world's tallest structure upon its completion in 1973 and remained so for more than 20 years. Both towers are the result of collaboration between architect Bruce Graham and engineer Fazlur Rahman Khan, who is often considered to be the greatest structural engineer of the 20th century. Khan invented a tubular framing system that made it possible to build higher than ever before. This system has been adapted and is still used today for some of the world's most recent tallest buildings, including the 828-meter-tall Burj Khalifa, designed by SOM and completed in 2010.

Digital design innovation 
In the 1960s and 1970s, SOM was an early leader in computer-aided design, developing in-house digital tools that preceded the CAD systems used widely today. This work quickly proved valuable in the generation of structural analysis tools that were embraced by Fazlur Khan and his engineering team, aiding the design of projects such as the John Hancock Center.

The activity of an experimental research group at SOM known as the Computer Group exemplifies a particularly productive effort within the firm to incorporate technological research into its practice. Through the 1970s and 1980s, members of the relatively small, dedicated group pushed to integrate the computer's enhanced data-storing and analytical abilities into various phases of the design process. Through these initiatives, SOM was able to identify the potential of the computer to not only expedite necessary calculations but also introduce new ways of representing and sharing information. Just as structural engineering came to be seen early on at SOM as a means of generating rather than simply realizing architectural ideas, with concerted effort, computers gained credence at the firm, and eventually throughout the industry, as a catalyst for architectural innovation. In 1980, an in-house team at SOM created Architecture Engineering Systems, a computer program that was used to study complex structural systems and energy demands. This program is regarded as a precursor to the array of building information modeling (BIM) tools now used by the profession.

Integrating art and architecture 
For decades, many of SOM's projects have featured works of art by significant artists. In many cases, the firm's architects and engineers played a role in commissioning, engineering, and installing the artworks—such as with the Chicago Picasso, a 50-foot-tall steel sculpture in the city's civic center. Joan Miró, Alexander Calder, Isamu Noguchi, Harry Bertoia, Richard Lippold,  Jean Dubuffet and Chryssa are among the artists whose work has been a part of SOM projects. More recently, SOM's architects and engineers have collaborated with artists such as James Turrell, Janet Echelman, Iñigo Manglano–Ovalle, James Carpenter, and Jaume Plensa.

People
SOM is structured as a partnership. The current partners and consulting partners are: Mustafa Abadan, William Baker, Thomas Behr, Keith Boswell, Carrie Byles, Larry Chien, Leo Chow, Brant Coletta, Chris Cooper, Paul Danna, Michael Duncan, Scott Duncan, Laura Ettelman, Xuan Fu, T.J. Gottesdiener, Gary Haney, Craig Hartman, Kent Jackson, Colin Koop, Kenneth Lewis, Mark Sarkisian, Adam Semel, Jonathan Stein, and Douglas Voigt.

Founders and notable architects

Gordon Bunshaft, who thrived as a design leader at SOM for more than 40 years, received the profession's highest honor, the Pritzker Architecture Prize, in 1988.
Notable architects who are associated with SOM include: Stephen Apking, T. J. Gottesdiener, Edward Charles Bassett, Natalie de Blois, Gordon Bunshaft, David Childs, Robert Diamant, Philip Enquist, Myron Goldsmith, Bruce Graham, Gary Haney, Craig W. Hartman, Gertrude Kerbis, Fazlur Rahman Khan. Lucien Lagrange, Walter Netsch, Larry Oltmanns, Eszter Pécsi, Brigitte Peterhans, Norma Merrick Sklarek, Adrian Smith, and Marilyn Jordan Taylor

Women at SOM
Architect Sally Harkness, a founding partner at The Architects Collaborative in 1947, was interviewed at the firm during World War II along with her husband Chip Harkness, but only her husband received a job offer. In an interview later in life, Sally Harkness explained that she was told the firm did not believe in hiring women. Norma Merrick Sklarek, an African-American, was hired by SOM in 1955 after having been previously rejected by 19 other firms. She stayed there for 5 years, eventually starting her own firm. Patricia Weston Swan spent her 30-year career with SOM including many leadership roles but never achieved partner status, perceived by a colleague in the Denver officer as evidence of the "glass ceiling" that was in place at that time at SOM

When Julia Murphy, AIA joined SOM in 2008 there were no women partners and only a handful of directors. To attempt to address this imbalance, in 2010 she relaunched the Women's Initiative at SOM which had previously been active between 2002 and 2004.

The year 2020 marked a change in which three female partners, Carrie Byles, Xuan Fu, and Laura Ettelman were named to the Executive Committee of the 1250-person firm.

SOM Foundation
The SOM Foundation was first established in 1979 with the mission to support and cultivate emerging design leaders by granting awards to outstanding students of architecture, design, urban design, and engineering. Many winners of SOM Foundation awards have gone on to distinguish themselves in professional and academic careers. Past winners include Marion Weiss (1982), Werner Sobek (1983), Himanshu Parikh (1985), Santiago Calatrava (1988), and Joshua Ramus (1995). The SOM Foundation continues to support emerging design leaders and interdisciplinary research with five annual awards granted to students from the United States, the United Kingdom, and China.

Awards
Throughout its history, SOM has been recognized with more than 2000 awards for quality and innovation. In 1996 and 1962, SOM received the Architecture Firm Award from the American Institute of Architects, which recognizes the design work of an entire firm. SOM is the only firm to have received this honor twice. In August 2009 SOM received four of 13 available R+D Awards from Architect Magazine. In addition, a collaboration between SOM and Rensselaer Polytechnic Institute, The Center for Architecture, Science and Ecology, was honored with a fifth award.

Disciplines

Urban design and planning 
Since the firm's founding, SOM has led large-scale urban design and planning projects. Many of these projects have had a lasting role in the development of cities and urban areas in America and the world, including London, Chicago, New York City, Washington, D.C., Baltimore, Denver, and Portland, Oregon. SOM's City Design practice has made influential contributions to urban design approaches such as transit-oriented development, overbuild strategies and sustainable urbanism.
In 1942, SOM was hired by the U.S. Army Corps of Engineers for a highly confidential project: the planning of Oak Ridge, Tennessee. By 1945, the town was home to 75,000 people. The work at Oak Ridge prepared SOM to take on the large-scale architectural and planning projects that would define the postwar era.

For more than 20 years, SOM was involved in the development of a master plan for the National Mall in Washington, D.C. In 1962, President John F. Kennedy appointed Nathaniel Owings as chair of the Pennsylvania Avenue redesign council, and the resulting 1966 Washington Mall Master Plan laid the framework for a dynamic, inviting, and pedestrian-friendly place. A second master plan developed in 1973, envisioned the construction of major cultural facilities, including the National Air and Space Museum, the Hirshhorn Museum and Sculpture Garden, and the National Gallery of Art Sculpture Garden.
In Baltimore in the 1960s, SOM played a pivotal role in preventing the destruction of the city's historic districts and Inner Harbor to make way for the planned construction of an elevated highway. As the chair of a team to develop an alternate plan, Nathaniel Owings convinced the Federal Highway Administration to sign off on a plan to reroute the highway. It was eventually built around the harbor and the historic Federal Hill district, saving these irreplaceable neighborhoods.

In the 1970s, SOM collaborated with landscape architect Lawrence Halprin to plan and design the Portland Transit Mall. The goals were to revitalize the Oregon city's downtown area, to encourage the use of mass transit, and create walkable streets. The Transit Mall helped to change the perception of downtown Portland. As one of the first projects of its kind in the United States, it helped to usher in an era of streetscape design that prioritizes people. Another important commission in the 1970s was as the lead design firm for the Boston Transportation Planning Review, a metropolitan-wide re-design of Boston's entire transit and roadway infrastructure.

Beginning in the 1980s, SOM planned the design and construction of Canary Wharf in London. Intended to accommodate a flourishing financial sector and revitalize London's former Docklands, the plan included more than 20 building sites and a host of public spaces and amenities. The plan also provided for a robust transportation network including a light rail station that connects to the London Underground. The massive scale of the project led to the opening of SOM's London office in 1986. The firm's work at Canary Wharf continued into the new millennium, with the completion of Five Canada Square in 2002.
In central London, the opportunity to build above rail lines near Liverpool Street Station spurred the construction of Broadgate, a new business district. SOM devised the master plan, and over three decades designed several of the site's 14 buildings. In order to build high-rise structures atop one of the city's busiest stations and its railyard, SOM's structural engineering team devised a deck over the tracks to allow for various building configurations on top. Exchange House, completed in 1990, is a building that acts as a bridge spanning the tracks. In 2008, Broadgate Tower, the district's tallest building, was completed. SOM also designed public space enhancements for the area.

SOM designed the master plan for Chicago's Millennium Park, which opened in 2004 and has become one of the city's most visited attractions. Constructed above bus lanes, parking garages, and a rail yard, Millennium Park can be considered the world's largest roof garden. Below the great lawn, two new levels of parking were built, bus stops were added, and rail stations were renovated and expanded, including Millennium Station. The project revitalized a formerly blighted downtown site and marked the completion of Chicago planner Daniel Burnham’s 100-year vision for the area.

In Denver, SOM was commissioned to expand and transform the city's historic Union Station into a major regional hub. 20 acres of former rail yards have been converted into a transit-oriented urban district that orchestrates light rail, pedestrian, bicycle, and bus routes, as well as commuter and intercity rail. Completed in 2014, the project has spurred more than $3.5 billion worth of private investment in the surrounding district.

Structural engineering
The earliest SOM engineer was John O. Merrill. Fazlur Khan, another engineer at SOM, is best known for his design and construction of the Willis Tower (formerly the Sears Tower), and John Hancock Center and for his designs of structural systems that remain fundamental to all high-rise skyscrapers. Indeed, Khan is responsible for developing the algorithms that made the Hancock building and many subsequent skyscrapers possible. Another notable SOM engineer is Bill Baker, who is best known as the engineer of Burj Khalifa (Dubai, 2010), the world's tallest man-made structure. To support the tower's record heights and slim footprint, he developed the "buttressed core" structural system, consisting of a hexagonal core reinforced by three buttresses that form a Y shape.

Interior design
Davis Allen, a pioneer in corporate interior design, had a forty-year tenure at SOM. The designer of the iconic Andover chair, Allen was an institution in "the profession he helped to establish—the total design of the interior corporate environment with furniture, art, and functional and decorative objects integrated into a comprehensively planned space.”

Notable projects

 Newark Liberty International Airport, Newark, New Jersey (ongoing)
 Karlatornet, Gothenburg, Sweden (ongoing)
 Greenland Shandong International Financial Center, Jinan, China (ongoing)
 Busan Lotte Town Tower, Busan, South Korea (ongoing)
 One Bangkok, Bangkok, Thailand (ongoing)
 Greenland Centre, Xi'an, China (ongoing)
 Burj Jumeirah, Dubai, United Arab Emirates (ongoing)
 Taipei Twin Towers, Taipei, Taiwan (ongoing)
 Moon Village (in partnership with European Space Agency and Massachusetts Institute of Technology – ongoing)
 Wild Mile, Chicago, Illinois (ongoing)
 Moynihan Train Hall, New York City, 2020
 United Nations Office at Geneva, renovation, 2020
 The Walt Disney Company, New York City headquarters (ongoing)
 Haeundae LCT The Sharp, Busan, South Korea, 2019
 Shenzhen Rural Commercial Bank Headquarters, Shenzhen, China, 2019
 Guoco Tower, Singapore, 2018
 The Stratford / Manhattan Loft Gardens, London, England, 2018
 Bio-Esfera, Guadalajara, Mexico, 2018
 Barnard College, The Milstein Center, New York City, 2018
 University of Connecticut, Innovation Partnership Building, Storrs, Connecticut, 2018
 NATO Headquarters, Brussels, Belgium, 2017
 Detroit East Riverfront Framework Plan, Detroit, Michigan, 2017
 Cornell Tech Master Plan, New York City,
 Chronicle Tower, London, 2016
 U.S. Air Force Academy, Center for Character and Leadership Development, Colorado Springs, Colorado, 2016
 Ningbo Bank of China Headquarters, Ningbo, China, 2016
 Public Safety Answering Center II, Bronx, New York, 2016
 Poly International Plaza, Beijing, China, 2016
 Superior Court of California, San Diego, 2016
 New U.S. Courthouse, Los Angeles, 2016
 The Strand, American Conservatory Theater (A.C.T.), San Francisco, 2016
 BBVA Bancomer Operations Center, Mexico City, Mexico, 2015
 Chicago Public Library, Chinatown Branch,  Chicago, Illinois, 2015
 350 Mission Street, San Francisco, 2015
 JTI Headquarters, Geneva, Switzerland, 2015
 AMIE 1.0, Oak Ridge, Tennessee, 2015
 One World Trade Center, New York City, 2014
 Denver Union Station, Denver, Colorado, 2014
 Chhatrapati Shivaji International Airport – Terminal 2, Mumbai, India, 2014
 Cayan Tower – Dubai, United Arab Emirates, 2013
 University Center, The New School, New York City, 2013
 Pearl River Tower, Guangzhou, China, 2013
 Al Hamra Tower, Kuwait City, Kuwait, 2011
 John Jay College of Criminal Justice, New York City, 2011
 Burj Khalifa, Dubai, United Arab Emirates, 2010
 Zifeng Tower, Nanjing, China, 2010
 Smithsonian National Museum of American History, Washington, D.C., 2008
 Cathedral of Christ the Light, Oakland, California, 2008
 U.S. Embassy, Beijing, China, 2008
 Toronto Pearson International Airport, Terminal 1, 2008
 201 Bishopsgate and Broadgate Tower,  London, 2008
 Changi International Airport, Terminal 3, Changi, Singapore, 2007
 U.S. Census Bureau Headquarters, Suitland, Maryland, 2007
 Tokyo Midtown, Tokyo, Japan, 2007
 Harvard University, Northwest Science Building, Cambridge Massachusetts, 2007
 7 World Trade Center, New York City, 2006
 Time Warner Center, New York City, 2004
 Chongming Island Master Plan, Shanghai, China, 2004
 Greenwich Academy, Upper School, Greenwich, Connecticut, 2002
 Millennium Park Master Plan, Chicago, 2002
 383 Madison Avenue, New York City, 2002
 Ben Gurion International Airport, Tel Aviv, Israel, 2002
 John F. Kennedy International Airport, International Arrivals Building, Terminal 4, New York City, 2001
 San Francisco International Airport, International Terminal, San Francisco, 2000
 Altice Arena (formerly Pavilhão Atlântico) Lisbon, Portugal, 1998
 1540 Broadway, New York City, 1990
 Exchange House, Broadgate Development, London, England, 1990
 One Worldwide Plaza, New York City, 1989
 Rowes Wharf, Boston, Massachusetts, 1986
 National Mall Redevelopment, Washington, D.C., 1986
 63 Building, Seoul, South Korea, 1985
 Northeast Corridor Improvement Project, 1985
 Demonet Building, Washington, D.C., 1984
 National Commercial Bank, Jeddah, Saudi Arabia, 1984
 Hubert H. Humphrey Metrodome, Minneapolis, Minnesota, 1982
 Hajj Terminal, King Abdul Aziz International Airport, Jeddah, Saudi Arabia, 1981
 Louise M. Davies Symphony Hall, San Francisco, 1980
 Willis Tower (formerly Sears Tower), Chicago, 1974
 One Shell Plaza, Houston, Texas, 1972
 Seneca One Tower, Buffalo, New York, 1972
One Shell Square, New Orleans, Louisiana, 1972
 Cornell University Uris Hall, Ithaca, New York, 1972
 Weyerhaeuser Company Headquarters Building, Tacoma, Washington, 1971
 Republic Newspaper Office and Printing Plant, Columbus, Indiana, 1971
 John Hancock Center, Chicago, 1970
 140 Broadway, New York City, 1967
 Oakland Arena, Oakland, California, 1966
 Oakland-Alameda County Coliseum, Oakland, California, 1966
 Radiation Research Building, University of Notre Dame, 1963
 Banque Lambert, Brussels, Belgium, 1964
 Lake Meadows Residential Community, Chicago, 1963
 Beinecke Rare Book and Manuscript Library, Yale University, New Haven, Connecticut, 1963
 Albright-Knox Art Gallery, Extension, Buffalo, New York, 1962
 United States Air Force Academy, Colorado Springs, Colorado, 1962
 28 Liberty Street (Chase Manhattan Bank Building), New York City, 1961
 Veterans Memorial Coliseum, Portland, Oregon, 1960
 Union Carbide Building, New York City, 1954
 500 Park Avenue (Pepsi-Cola Corporation World Headquarters), New York City, 1960
 John Hancock Western Home Office (Industrial Indemnity Building), San Francisco, 1959
 United Airlines Hangar and Wash Hangar, San Francisco International Airport, San Francisco, 1958
 Inland Steel Building, Chicago, 1958
 Connecticut General Life Insurance Company, Bloomfield, Connecticut, 1957
 Manufacturers Trust Company Building, New York City, 1954
 Naval Station Great Lakes, Chicago, 1954
 Lever House, New York City, 1952
 Manhattan House, New York City, 1951
 Oak Ridge New Town Master Plan, Oak Ridge, Tennessee, 1949
 Terrace Plaza Hotel, Cincinnati, Ohio, 1948

References

External links

 
 Review of the 1954 Manufacturer's Hanover Trust Branch Bank in NYC
 Skidmore, Owings & Merrill Architecture on Google Maps
 Skidmore, Owings & Merrill photographs, circa 1945-1969 Held in the Dept. of Drawings & Archives, Avery Architectural & Fine Arts Library, Columbia University, New York City

 
Architecture firms based in Chicago
Modernist architects
Design companies established in 1936
1936 establishments in Illinois
Skyscraper architects